Bratske is an urban-type settlement in Voznesensk Raion in the north of Mykolaiv Oblast, Ukraine. It hosts the administration of Bratske settlement hromada, one of the hromadas of Ukraine. Population: 

Bratske is located on the banks of the Mertvovid, a right tributary of the Southern Bug.

History
Bratske was founded by Zaporozhian Cossacks in the 18th century. In the 1860s, it belonged to Yelisavetgradsky Uyezd of Kherson Governorate On 16 April 1920, Kherson Governorate was renamed Nikolayev Governorate, and on 21 October 1922, it was merged into Odessa Governorate. In 1923, uyezds in Ukrainian Soviet Socialist Republic were abolished, and the governorates were divided into okruhas. In 1923, Bratske Raion with the administrative center located in Bratske was established. It belonged to Lyzavethrad Okruha (in 1924 renamed Zinovievsk Okruha). In 1925, the governorates were abolished, and okruhas were directly subordinated to Ukrainian SSR. In 1930, okruhas were abolished, and on 27 February 1932, Odessa Oblast was established, and Bratske Raion was included into Odessa Oblast. In 1944, Bratske Raion was transferred to Mykolaiv Oblast. In 1956, Bratske was granted urban-type settlement status.

On 18 July 2020, Bratske Raion was abolished as part of the administrative reform of Ukraine, which reduced the number of raions of Mykolaiv Oblast to four. The area of Bratske Raion was merged into Voznesensk Raion.

Economy

Transportation

References

Urban-type settlements in Voznesensk Raion
Yelisavetgradsky Uyezd